The 1952 West Virginia Mountaineers football team was an American football team that represented West Virginia University in the Southern Conference (SoCon) during the 1952 college football season. In its third season under head coach Art Lewis, the team compiled a 7–2 record (5–1 against SoCon opponents), finished second in the conference, and outscored opponents by a total of 234 to 116. The team played its home games at Mountaineer Field in Morgantown, West Virginia. Paul Bischoff was the team captain.

Schedule

References

West Virginia Mountaineers football seasons
West Virginia
West Virginia Mountaineers football